USS Dynamic (AM-432) was an  in service with the United States Navy and the Spanish Navy. Laid down on 31 October 1951 at Colberg Boat Works, Stockton, California; launched on 17 December 1952; commissioned as USS Dynamic (AM-432) on 15 December 1953; redesignated MSO-432, 7 February 1955.

Service history
Assigned to Mine Division 91, Squadron 9, Mine Force, Pacific Fleet, Dynamic operated out of her home port of Long Beach, California, that included training with other ships, aircraft, soldiers and Marines, and with minesweepers of other navies. She cruised to the Far East in 1957-58 visiting ports in Japan, Korea, and Taiwan, and participated in minesweeping exercises with ships of the Republic of China and Korean navies.

She made a similar cruise in the first half of 1960, joined the other fleet units in the "Pacific Festival" at San Francisco, California, in September and received a yard overhaul during the remainder of the year.

Dynamic became a part of Mine Division 91 in September 1967.

Decommissioning
Dynamic was decommissioned on 8 June 1971, and sold to Spain on 17 July 1971 under the Security Assistance Program to serve as Guadalete (M41). Dynamic was struck from the Naval Register on 1 August 1974. Guadalete was reclassified PVZ-41 in 1980; and decommissioned on 15 July 1998. Fate unknown.

External links
 Reunion site for the USS Dynamic.

References
 

 

Aggressive-class minesweepers
Ships built in Stockton, California
1952 ships
Cold War minesweepers of the United States
Aggressive-class minesweepers of the Spanish Navy